Epperly may refer to:

 Epperly, West Virginia, United States, an unincorporated community in Raleigh County
 Mount Epperly, in Antarctica

People
 Al Epperly (1918–2003), American baseball player
 Bruce G. Epperly (born 1953), American theologian
 Jillian Mai Thi Epperly (born c. 1973/4), creator of Jilly Juice
 Quin Epperly (1913–2001), American race car builder